Tropatepine (brand name Lepticur) is an anticholinergic used as an antiparkinsonian agent.

Synthesis

The Grignard reaction between 3-Chlorotropane, CID:21122177 (1) and Dibenzo[b,e]thiepin-11(6H)-one [1531-77-7] (2) followed by dehydration to olefin completed the synthesis of Tropatepine (3).
(2)

See also 
Muscarinic antagonist

References 

Muscarinic antagonists
Tropanes
Dibenzothiepines